Shakhtyor Stadium (Shahtıor stadıony) is a multi-use stadium in Ekibastuz, Kazakhstan.  It is currently used mostly for football matches and is the home stadium of FC Ekibastuzets. 

Football venues in Kazakhstan